The 1978 season of 1. deild karla was the 24th season of second-tier football in Iceland. It is notable for being the only season KR have spent outside the top tier.

Standings

Top scorers

References
 

1. deild karla (football) seasons
Iceland
Iceland
2